Stonycreek Township may refer to the following places:

 Stonycreek Township, Somerset County, Pennsylvania
 Stonycreek Township, Cambria County, Pennsylvania

See also
Stoney Creek Township (disambiguation)
Stonycreek (disambiguation)

Township name disambiguation pages